Sir George Frederick Jenkins KBE (24 June 1878 – 25 July 1957) was an Australian politician. He was a Liberal and Country League member of the South Australian House of Assembly, representing Burra Burra from 1918 to 1924, 1927 to 1930 and 1933 to 1938, and Newcastle from 1938 to 1956. He served as Minister for Agriculture and Town Planning (1922–23), Minister for Local Government and Marine (1923–24, 1927–30), Minister for Railways (1930), and Minister for Agriculture and Forests (1944–54).

References

 

1878 births
1957 deaths
Liberal and Country League politicians
Members of the South Australian House of Assembly
Australian Knights Commander of the Order of the British Empire
Australian politicians awarded knighthoods
Place of birth missing